German collective guilt refers to the notion of a collective guilt attributed to Germany and its people for perpetrating the Holocaust and other atrocities in World War II.

Advocates
Swiss psychoanalyst Carl Jung wrote an influential essay in 1945 about this concept as a psychological phenomenon, in which he asserted that the German people felt a collective guilt (Kollektivschuld) for the atrocities committed by their fellow countrymen, and so introduced the term into German intellectual discourse. Jung said collective guilt was "for psychologists a fact, and it will be one of the most important tasks of therapy to bring the Germans to recognize this guilt."

After the war, the Allied occupation forces in Allied-occupied Germany promoted shame and guilt with a publicity campaign, which included posters depicting Nazi concentration camps with slogans such as "These Atrocities: Your Fault!" (Diese Schandtaten: Eure Schuld!).

The theologian Martin Niemöller and other churchmen accepted shared guilt in the Stuttgarter Schuldbekenntnis (Stuttgart Declaration of Guilt) of 1945. The philosopher and psychologist Karl Jaspers delivered lectures to students in 1946 which were published under the title The Question of German Guilt. In this published work, Jaspers describes how "an acknowledgment of national guilt was a necessary condition for the moral and political rebirth of Germany". Additionally, Jaspers believed that no one could escape this collective guilt, and taking responsibility for it might enable the German people to transform their society from its state of collapse into a more highly developed and morally responsible democracy. He believed that those who committed war crimes were morally guilty, and those who tolerated them without resistance were politically guilty, leading to collective guilt for all.

The German collective guilt for the events of the Holocaust has long been an idea that has been pondered by famous and well-known German politicians and thinkers. In addition to those mentioned previously, German author and philosopher Bernhard Schlink describes how he sometimes feels as if being German is a huge burden, due to the country's past. According to Schlink, "the reason the European crisis is so agonising for Germany is that the country has been able to retreat from itself by hurling itself into the European project". Schlink also believes that "the burden of nationality has very much shaped the way in which Germans view themselves and their responsibilities within Europe", and he describes how Germans see themselves as Atlanticists or Europeans, rather than as Germans. Schlink sees this existing guilt becoming weaker from generation to generation. Thomas Mann also advocated for collective guilt:

See also

References

1945 establishments in Germany
1940s neologisms
Aftermath of World War II in Germany
Anti-German sentiment
Carl Jung
German culture
Guilt
The Holocaust in Germany

cs:Kolektivní vina#Kolektivní vina v Německu
de:Kollektivschuld#Kollektivschulddebatte zu Krieg und Holocaust